In mathematics and solid state physics, the first Brillouin zone is a uniquely defined primitive cell in reciprocal space.  In the same way the Bravais lattice is divided up into Wigner–Seitz cells in the real lattice, the reciprocal lattice is broken up into Brillouin zones. The boundaries of this cell are given by planes related to points on the reciprocal lattice. The importance of the Brillouin zone stems from the description of waves in a periodic medium given by Bloch's theorem, in which it is found that the solutions can be completely characterized by their behavior in a single Brillouin zone.

The first Brillouin zone is the locus of points in reciprocal space that are closer to the origin of the reciprocal lattice than they are to any other reciprocal lattice points (see the derivation of the Wigner–Seitz cell). Another definition is as the set of points in k-space that can be reached from the origin without crossing any Bragg plane.  Equivalently, this is the Voronoi cell around the origin of the reciprocal lattice.

There are also second, third, etc., Brillouin zones, corresponding to a sequence of disjoint regions (all with the same volume) at increasing distances from the origin, but these are used less frequently.  As a result, the first Brillouin zone is often called simply the Brillouin zone.  In general, the n-th Brillouin zone consists of the set of points that can be reached from the origin by crossing exactly n − 1 distinct Bragg planes. A related concept is that of the irreducible Brillouin zone, which is the first Brillouin zone reduced by all of the symmetries in the point group of the lattice (point group of the crystal).

The concept of a Brillouin zone was developed by Léon Brillouin (1889–1969), a French physicist.

Within the Brillouin zone, a constant-energy surface represents the loci of all the -points (that is, all the electron momentum  values) that have the same energy. Fermi surface is a special constant-energy surface that separates the unfilled orbitals from the filled ones at zero kelvin.

Critical points

	 
Several points of high symmetry are of special interest – these are called critical points.
 	

Other lattices have different types of high-symmetry points. They can be found in the illustrations below.

See also 

 Fundamental pair of periods
 Fundamental domain

References

Bibliography

External links
Brillouin Zone simple lattice diagrams by Thayer Watkins
Brillouin Zone 3d lattice diagrams by Technion.
DoITPoMS Teaching and Learning Package- "Brillouin Zones"
Aflowlib.org consortium database (Duke University)
AFLOW Standardization of VASP/QUANTUM ESPRESSO input files (Duke University)

Crystallography
Electronic band structures
Vibrational spectroscopy